Places We Don't Know is the debut studio album by the Swedish electronic music producer Kasbo, released on 23 March 2018 through Counter Records and Family Foreign Collective.

Singles 
The album's first single, "Lay It on Me" featuring Keiynan Lonsdale, was released on 28 June 2017. The second and third singles, "Bleed It Out" featuring Nea and "Snow In Gothenburg", were released 24 October and 12 December respectively. Both songs received music videos.

The fourth single, "Aldrig Mer" featuring TENDER, was released 18 January 2018 alongside the announcement of Places We Don't Know. The fifth and sixth singles, "Your Tempo" and "Over You" featuring Frida Sundemo were released 13 February and 13 March respectively.

Tour 
On 19 January 2018, Kasbo announced several headlining shows for the Places We Don't Know Tour. On February 12, BAYNK was revealed as an opening act for several of the shows.

Track listing

References 

2018 debut albums
Kasbo albums